Kanaidanga  is a village in Chanditala I community development block of Srirampore subdivision in Hooghly district in the Indian state of West Bengal.

Geography

Gram panchayat
Villages and census towns in Bhagabatipur gram panchayat are: Bhadua, Bhagabatipur, Jalamadul, Kanaidanga, Metekhal and Singjor.

Demographics
As per 2011 Census of India, Kanaidanga had a total population of 4,517 of which 2,268 (50%) were males and 2,249 (50%) were females. Population below 6 years was 523. The total number of literates in Kanaidanga was 3,000 (75.11% of the population over 6 years).

References 

Villages in Chanditala I CD Block